The Burlington-Rock Island Railroad  came into existence on July 7, 1930, through the reorganization of its predecessor, the Trinity and Brazos Valley Railway Company (T&BV), nicknamed the "Boll Weevil Line."

Like its predecessor, the BRI was jointly owned by the Chicago, Burlington and Quincy Railroad (CB&Q) and the Chicago, Rock Island and Pacific Railroad (Rock Island), with each company owning half of the railroad. "It took its new name from the two owning systems and operated  of track in 1930."

History
The Trinity and Brazos Valley Railway (T&BV) was originally chartered on October 9, 1902, its first trackage consisting of an  line from Cleburne, Texas, to Mexia, Texas, which was finished in January 1904. Due to a shortage of operating capital to complete the project, the railroad was acquired in August 1905 by the Colorado and Southern Railway, which later sold a half interest in its investment to the Rock Island. The Colorado and Southern was bought by the Burlington in 1908. Due to the influx of funds from these well-heeled financial partners, by 1907 the T&BV line had been extended to Houston from the Mexia terminal, with a line also added between Waxahachie and Teague. Trackage rights were also soon arranged with other railroads linking the T&BV with Waxahachie and Dallas, Cleburne and Fort Worth, and Houston and Galveston.

With ongoing financial problems resulting from inadequate revenue, the Trinity and Brazos Valley went into receivership in 1914. A series of receivers were appointed including John W. Robbins (1914), L.H. Atwell, Jr, and in 1919, Gen. John A. Hulen. Hulen eventually became the first president of the BRI when the T&BV reorganized.

Reorganization
Hulen had begun improvements on the Trinity and Brazos while he was receiver, and this trend was continued after the reorganization. The two parent companies rotated their management of the BRI in 5 year intervals; the Rock Island started first and controlled the BRI until 1935.

Along with their partner the CB&Q, the BRI inaugurated the first streamlined passenger train service in Texas on October 1, 1936, the Sam Houston Zephyr.  Listed as a CB&Q train, it ran from Dallas-Fort Worth to Houston. Not to be outdone, Rock Island in cooperation with the BRI inaugurated its own named streamlined passenger train in 1937, the Texas Rocket. The Rocket was replaced in January 1945 by the Twin Star Rocket, listed as a Rock Island train running between Houston and Minneapolis-St. Paul.

A major change in the BRI landscape came in 1950 when the Rock Island partnered with the Fort Worth and Denver Railway to lease the BRI's line section from Teague to Houston, which they called the Joint Texas division.

The BRI never lived up to its financial promise, finally succumbing to foreclosure in April 1964. Its assets were purchased by the owning partners, each receiving an uncontested half interest in the property. The railroad's tangible assets became part of the Fort Worth and Denver and Rock Island railroads in 1965 and the Burlington-Rock Island Railroad was no more. Rock Island went out of business on March 31, 1980, leaving the Fort Worth and Denver in sole control; it in turn merged into the Burlington Northern system on December 31, 1982. Burlington Northern would merge with the Atchison, Topeka, and Santa Fe in 1996 to form Ft. Worth-based BNSF Railway.

In 1940 B-RI reported 78 million net ton-miles of revenue freight and 16 million passenger miles; at the end of that year it operated 255 miles of railroad.

Burlington-Rock Island Zephyrs and Rockets

Sam Houston Zephyr (Dallas-Fort Worth–Houston) (with CB&Q)
Texas Rocket (Dallas-Fort Worth–Houston) (counterpart to the Zephyr with Rock Island)
Twin Star Rocket (Houston–Minneapolis-St. Paul) (with Rock Island)

References

Defunct Texas railroads
Former Class I railroads in the United States
Predecessors of the Chicago, Rock Island and Pacific Railroad
Predecessors of the Colorado and Southern Railway
Railway companies established in 1930
Railway companies disestablished in 1964